Discordipinna griessingeri is a small, brightly colored, marine neritic fish in the family Gobiidae that is commonly called the spikefin goby or flaming prawn goby.  Occasionally it is mislabeled as "Stonogobiops griessingeri" which is a binomial species name that does not formally exist. The spikefin goby has a wide distribution across reefs throughout the western tropical Pacific, Pacific Islands such as Hawai'i and Polynesia, the Indian Ocean and the Red Sea. It is also occasionally collected and traded as an exotic aquarium fish in multiple countries.

Description 
Discordipinna griessingeri is mostly white in the body, with orange stripes down the body and length of the dorsal fin, and dark spots on the face. Additionally, they have a large protruding dorsal fin just behind the head that characterizes them.  The pectoral fin rays are also elongated. The body of spikefin gobies are completely scaled, with ctenoid scales on the posterior and cycloid scales on the anterior.  It is between 10 and 22 mm in SL as an adult and any sexual dimorphism is currently unknown.

Distribution and habitat 
The spikefin goby is found throughout the western Pacific Ocean, as well as in the Indian Ocean and the Red Sea. It is a benthic fish that inhabits crevices and pockets in coral reefs between 2 and 50 meters in depth along the reef rock, rubble, and sand.  It is reclusive and is not associated with burrows or prawns.

Binomial name 
The genus name comes from the Latin, discors, meaning different, and from Latin pinna, meaning fin. The species name is after Mr. S. Griessinger, the collector of one of the paratype specimens.

References 

Fish of the Pacific Ocean
Marine fish
Fish described in 1978
Gobiidae